Aphalarinae is a bug subfamily in the family Aphalaridae.

Overview of genera 
 Aphalara
 Brachystetha
 Caillardia
 Colposcenia
 Craspedolepta
 Crastina
 Epheloscyta
 Eumetoecus
 Eurotica
 Gyropsylla
 Hodkinsonia
 Lanthanaphalara
 Limataphalara
 Neaphalara
 Rhodochlanis
 Rhombaphalara
 Xenaphalara
 †Eogyropsylla
 †Necropsylla
 †Paleopsylloides
 †Proeurotica

References

External links 

Aphalaridae
Hemiptera subfamilies